Paul Chahidi (born August 22, 1969) is a British actor.

An associate artist of the Royal Shakespeare Company, Chahidi appeared at Shakespeare's Globe and appeared on Broadway in all-male productions of Twelfth Night and Richard III. Chahidi was nominated for both an Olivier award and a Tony Award for his portrayal of Maria in Twelfth Night, where he appeared alongside Mark Rylance's Olivia.

Chahidi played defence minister Nikolai Bulganin in Armando Iannucci's historical comedy The Death of Stalin.

Chahidi has a recurring role in British TV comedy This Country, in which he plays a vicar who tries to help the characters created and played by siblings Charlie Cooper and Daisy May Cooper.

Personal life
Chahidi is of Iranian descent.

Filmography

Other work 
Paul Chahidi has appeared on a number of popular podcasts, including The QuaranTea Break Podcast with Simon Ward, and Seven Stages the podcast from The Stage.

References

External links

Year of birth missing (living people)
Living people
British male stage actors
British male television actors
Royal Shakespeare Company members
British people of Iranian descent
Place of birth missing (living people)
Theatre World Award winners